This is a list of Technological Universities in Myanmar. They are administered by the Ministry of Science and Technology.

Technological Universities
 Pyay Technological University
 Technological University, Bhamo
 Technological University, Dawei
 Technological University, Hinthada
 Technological University, Hmawbi
 Technological University, Hpa-An
 Technological University, Kalay
 Technological University, Kyaingtong
 Technological University, Kyaukse
 Technological University, Lashio
 Technological University, Loikaw
 Technological University, Magway
 Technological University, Mandalay
 Technological University, Maubin
 Technological University, Mawlamyaing
 Technological University, Meiktila
 Technological University, Mhawbi
 Technological University, Monywa
 Technological University, Myeik
 Technological University, Myitkyina
 Technological University, Pakokku
 Technological University, Panglong
 Technological University, Pathein
 Technological University, Sagaing
 Technological University, Sittwe
 Technological University, Taunggyi
 Technological University, Taungoo
 Technological University, Thanlyin
 Technological University, Yamethin
 Yangon Technological University
 West Yangon Technological University
 Mandalay Technological University

References 

Ministry of Science and Technology (Myanmar)

 
Myanmar education-related lists